La Puta y el Diablo is the ninth album by the Spanish alternative metal band Hamlet. The band introduced a groove metal oriented sound. Mixing and mastering was done by Logan Mader.

It is the first album with new guitarist Alberto Marín and their first with Roadrunner Records.

Track listing

Members 
J. Molly - vocals
Luis Tárraga - lead and rhythm guitar
Alberto Marín - lead and rhythm guitar
Álvaro Tenorio - bass
Paco Sánchez - drums

References

Additional sources
Album review on metalcry.com
Album review on mariskalrock.com

2009 albums
Hamlet (band) albums
Roadrunner Records albums